Change file may refer to:

 CWEB change file, a file documenting changes that is automatically merged during compilation/printing
 patch file, a file containing source code changes that can be patched into source files
 File change log, a file containing a log  tracking changes to a file system
 Changelog file, a file containing a change log, a log of significant changes to a project

See also

 Log file, a file logging activity
 
 Change (disambiguation)
 File (disambiguation)